Strange Birds in Paradise, subtitled A West Papuan Story is an Australian documentary film created by Adelaide filmmaker Charlie Hill-Smith.

Reception
Andrew Fenton, The Advertiser states that Hill-Smith is trying to put too much into the film, writing "There are some powerful scenes but the overall result is an unfocused narrative that follows too many threads." Sallie Don wrote in The Australian that "It's via the music that filmmaker Charlie Hill-Smith documents the story, and he pushes you to look beyond the few impressions you may have of this wild and mostly inaccessible part of the world."

Accolades

Soundtrack

The soundtrack album Strange Birds in Paradise: A West Papuan Soundtrack was released through Wantok Musik. It earned  David Bridie, Hein Arumisore, Jacob Rumbiak, Ronny Kareni and Donny Roem a nomination for a 2001 ARIA Award for Best World Music Album.

Track listing
Land Of The Morning Star
Jo Jo
E Mambo Simbo
Syofirumo
Sup Sup
Oweluk Tiage
Mapnduma
Yapo Mama Cica
Garamutarama
Awino Sup Ine
Apuse
Mystery Of Life
To Samuai Tandu
Kelly Kwalik Amungme Surge

References

External links
Strange Birds in Paradise

2009 films
Australian documentary films